Shonan Beach FM is a radio station based in Zushi in Kanagawa Prefecture, Japan. Operated by Zushi Hayama Community Broadcasting Company, it broadcasts mainly jazz, but also features R&B and Big Band, as well as a certain amount of Hawaiian and classical music.

Transmitting on a frequency of 78.9 MHz, Shonan Beach FM was established on 3 December 1993. Ten years after its launch it had gathered a listenership of around 200,000 in Japan alone and many more via the internet, over which its output is streamed.

Although the station's (minimal) spoken output is in Japanese, its website does include some information in English.

External links
 Official English version of the website
 Simulradio webpage (in Japanese)

Mass media in Kanagawa Prefecture
Radio stations in Japan
Internet radio stations
Radio stations established in 1993